Joseph Ralph Napolitano (November 22, 1948 – July 23, 2016) was an American television director who worked on multiple episodic series. He previously was a film assistant director.

Career
Napolitano's television credits include directing twelve episodes of Quantum Leap, two episodes of The X-Files, two episodes of Picket Fences, three episodes of The Pretender, two episodes of L.A. Doctors, two episodes of Dawson's Creek, four episodes of Boston Public, and fourteen episodes of Strong Medicine, as well as the 1991 TV film Earth Angel. The TV film Contagious earned an American Latino Media Arts Award for actress Elizabeth Peña for 'Outstanding Actress in a Made-for-Television Movie or Mini-Series'.

In the 1980s, Napolitano's work included acting as assistant director on feature film projects, working on films with directors Brian Hutton, Danny DeVito, Stuart Rosenberg, Donald P. Bellisario, Ron Howard, Howard Zieff, Terry Gilliam, Antoine Fuqua, and on multiple projects directed by Brian De Palma.

Filmography

As director

Television
The Big Blue Marble (unknown episodes)
Earth Angel (1991) (TV film)
Reasonable Doubts (1 episode, 1991)
I'll Fly Away (1 episode, 1992)
Quantum Leap (12 episodes, 1990–1992)
 Covington Cross (1 episode, 1992)
 Going to Extremes (1 episode, 1992)
 Northern Exposure (1 episode, 1993)
 Class of '96 (1 episode, 1993)
 SeaQuest 2032 (1 episode, 1993)
 The Adventures of Brisco County, Jr. (1 episode, 1993)
 The X-Files (2 episodes, 1993–1994)
 M.A.N.T.I.S. (1 episode, 1994)
 Medicine Ball (1995)
 Earth 2 (3 episodes, 1994–1995)
 Chicago Hope (1 episode, 1995)
 Picket Fences (2 episodes, 1995–1996)
 Murder One (1 episode, 1996)
 Viper (1 episode, 1996)
 Contagious (1997) (TV film)
 The Practice (1 episode, 1997)
 JAG (4 episodes, 1995–1997)
 Ally McBeal (1 episode, 1997)
 Hotel del Sol (1998)
 The Pretender (3 episodes, 1997–1998)
 Mercy Point (1998)
 Wasteland (1 episode, 1999)
 L.A. Doctors (2 episodes, 1999)
 Cold Feet (1999)
 Martial Law (1 episode, 1999)
 Snoops (1 episode, 1999)
 Dawson's Creek (2 episodes, 1998–2000)
 The Huntress (2000)
 FreakyLinks (1 episode, 2001)
 Kate Brasher (2001)
 For the People (2002)
 Birds of Prey (1 episode, 2003)
 Boston Public (4 episodes, 2001–2003)
 The District (1 episode, 2003)
 Strong Medicine (14 episodes, 2000–2006)
 Bones (1 episode, 2006)
 Runaway (1 episode, 2006)
 Cashmere Mafia (1 episode, 2008)

Video games
 Zork: Nemesis (1996)

As first assistant director

Film
The First Deadly Sin (1980) – Director: Brian Hutton
Blow Out (1981) – Director: Brian De Palma
Scarface (1983) – Director: Brian De Palma
The Pope of Greenwich Village (1984) – Director: Stuart Rosenberg
Body Double (1984) – Director: Brian De Palma
Wise Guys (1986) – Director: Brian De Palma
The Untouchables (1987) – Director: Brian De Palma
 Throw Momma from the Train (1987) – Director: Danny DeVito
Last Rites (1988) Also as second unit director – Director: Donald P. Bellisario
Parenthood (1989) – Director: Ron Howard
The Dream Team (1989) – Director: Howard Zieff
The Fisher King (1991) – Director: Terry Gilliam
Brooklyn's Finest (2008) Also co-producer – Director: Antoine Fuqua

References

External links
 
 

1948 births
2016 deaths
American television directors
People from Brooklyn
Artists from New York City